Chaklu is a large village in Baramulla district, Jammu and Kashmir, India. Chaklu village has total population of 3366 of which 1722 are males while 1644 are females.

References 

Villages in Baramulla district